Thomas Andrew Watson (21 February 1904 – 1979) was an English footballer who played as a full back for Rochdale. He was also on the reserve teams of Middlesbrough and Accrington Stanley and played non-league football for various other clubs.

References

Rochdale A.F.C. players
Middlesbrough F.C. players
Accrington Stanley F.C. (1891) players
Washington F.C. players
Consett A.F.C. players
Guildford City F.C. players
Macclesfield Town F.C. players
Mossley A.F.C. players
Footballers from South Shields
English footballers
Association football fullbacks
1904 births
1979 deaths